Railton is a town situated 20 km inland from Devonport on the north-west coast of Tasmania, Australia's island state.
The locality is in the Kentish Council area, but with about 1% in the Latrobe LGA.

History
Railton was first surveyed in 1853 and a railway line through the town from Deloraine to Latrobe was completed in 1885. Early settlers who were mainly farmers and timber workers lived in slab huts. The new settlers quickly drove out the traditional owners of the area. The wider main street was built for the drovers mustering cattle to the railway station to be loaded for export. By the 1900s Railton had a flourishing timber trade with 2 sawmills.

Railton has several topiaries in various locations around the town. Visit the "Town of Topiary" website for information on how to find them.

Railton promotes itself as the "Town of Topiary".

Railton is home to a Cement Australia plant which began operations in 1923. It was previously known as Goliath Cement.

Facilities

Railton is very popular for mountain bike riding with many tracks around the entire area, a playground park with bbq areas, squash courts, lawn bowls, a neighbourhood centre, a caravan park, public toilets, a town hall and a primary school.

Railton Primary School is a campus of Sheffield School. (years P-4).

Sykes Sanctuary 
Sykes was an eccentric conservationist who gave up city life to live in a small shack, close to nature.

References

Localities of Kentish Council
Towns in Tasmania